A Tango Tragedy is a 1914 American silent comedy film featuring Oliver Hardy.

Plot

Cast
 Billy Bowers as Pat Muldune
 Frances Ne Moyer as Nora Muldune
 James Hodges as Dick Kelly
 Raymond McKee as Bill Ryan
 Julia Calhoun as The Widow
 Oliver Hardy (as Babe Hardy)

See also
 List of American films of 1914
 Oliver Hardy filmography

External links

1914 films
American silent short films
Silent American comedy films
American black-and-white films
1914 comedy films
1914 short films
American comedy short films
1910s American films